Strawberry Hill is a historic neighborhood in Kansas City, Kansas, United States. It is bordered by Minnesota Avenue to its north, by Interstate 70 to its east and south, and by 7th Street to its west.

History
Strawberry Hill was previously known as Splitlog Hill, named after Mathias Splitlog, a wealthy Wyandotte Indian mill owner who purchased the area in 1870 with the goal of building a manor.
He later sold parcels of the land to the Catholic parish and to nearby railroad companies. After the land was subdivided in the late 1800s, the neighborhood began to fill in, first with Irish and German immigrants, and then by Croatian and Slovene immigrants from the Primorje-Gorski Kotar and Karlovac areas. Most Strawberry Hill residents at the turn of the 20th Century worked in the meat-packing industry, whose factories and lots were in close proximity to the neighborhood in Kansas City, Kansas's side of West Bottoms.

Between 1900 and 1913, Strawberry Hill had significant growth with a new wave of Slavs emigrating from Croatia, Slovenia, Serbia, and Russia. During this time, many new churches were founded. St. John the Baptist Catholic Parish was founded in 1900, Holy Family Catholic Parish was founded in 1908 independent from the diocese, and Holy Trinity Russian Orthodox Church was founded on the southern portion of Strawberry Hill, known as Russian Hill. St. George Serbian Orthodox Church was also founded by Serbian immigrants in Strawberry Hill, but the church was not located in the neighborhood.

In 1918, the Spanish flu epidemic reached Strawberry Hill, killing many residents. In 1919, in response to the influx of orphaned children, the church of St. John the Baptist and the Sisters of St. Francis of Christ the King purchased the Cruise-Scroggs manor near the parish and converted it into an orphanage. 

In 1957, 219 homes and four streets in Strawberry Hill—roughly one third of the neighborhood—were claimed through eminent domain and bulldozed to clear a path for Interstate 70, compelling many residents to leave the neighborhood. In the early 1990s, the breakup of Yugoslavia brought a small wave of Yugoslav immigrants to the area, primarily Croats and Bosniaks.

Strawberry Hill has had increased interest in recent years, due to its proximity to downtown Kansas City, Missouri, and because of its relatively inexpensive housing stock. In 2019, the University of Kansas Health System opened a health care center at the northern end of the neighborhood, naming its campus Strawberry Hill. Development along Central Ave. and proposed redevelopments along the Kaw River are also pressing more interest toward the neighborhood for investors and owner-occupants.

See also
 List of books about Wyandotte County, Kansas

Further reading

References

External links
 Strawberry Hill Neighborhood Association
 Community Life in Strawberry Hill, from a Library of Congress website
 Strawberry Hill Museum and Cultural Center

Croatian-American history
Neighborhoods in Kansas City, Kansas
Russian-American history
Serbian-American history
Slovene-American history